Mehdili (also, Mekhdili and Mekhtili) is a village in the Jabrayil Rayon of Azerbaijan.

The village was captured by Armenian forces in the First Nagorno-Karabakh War. On October 3, 2020, the Azerbaijani Ministry of Defence announced that the Azerbaijani Army had taken control of the village.

References 

Populated places in Jabrayil District